The third series of Ex on the Beach Italy, an Italian television programme, began airing on October 13, 2021 on MTV Italy. It was announced in June 2021 and premiered on October 13 of that same year.

A series of four special episodes that premiered between September 15 and 22 under the name "Ex On The Beach Italia - What Happened Next" was also confirmed, in which everything that happened to them is revealed. to the cast members of the first and second seasons once they returned to everyday life, while on September 29 and October 2 the last two episodes entitled "Ex On The Beach Italia - Casting" were released where it was shown the casting and all cast members.

Cast 

 Bold indicates original cast member; all other cast were brought into the series as an ex.

Duration of cast 

 Table Key
 Key:  = "Cast member" is featured in this episode
 Key:  = "Cast member" arrives on the beach
 Key:  = "Cast member" has an ex arrive on the beach
 Key:  = "Cast member" arrives on the beach and has an ex arrive during the same episode
 Key:  = "Cast member" leaves the beach
 Key:  = "Cast member" arrives on the beach and leaves during the same episode
 Key:  = "Cast member" does not feature in this episode

Episodes

References

External links 

 Official website

2021 Italian television seasons
01